Parnkalla is a genus of cicadas in the family Cicadidae. There is at least one described species in Parnkalla, P. muelleri.

References

Further reading

External links

 

Cicadidae genera